Mauricio Ugartemendia Lauzirika (26 July 1934 – 18 February 2022), commonly known as Mauri, was a Spanish footballer who played as a midfielder.

Club career
Born in Gernika, Basque Country, Mauri spent 11 seasons in La Liga with Athletic Bilbao. He made his debut in the competition on 20 September 1953, in a 2–3 home loss against Real Madrid.

Mauri appeared in 293 official matches during his spell at the San Mamés Stadium, scoring 72 goals. In the top flight he also represented CE Sabadell FC, during the second part of the 1965–66 campaign.

International career
Mauri won five caps for Spain in one year. His first came on 18 May 1955, in a 1–1 friendly draw with England in Madrid.

Death
On 18 February 2022, Mauri died at the age of 87.

Honours
Athletic Bilbao
La Liga: 1955–56
Copa del Generalísimo: 1955, 1956, 1958

References

External links

1934 births
2022 deaths
People from Guernica
Sportspeople from Biscay
Spanish footballers
Footballers from the Basque Country (autonomous community)
Association football midfielders
La Liga players
Segunda División players
Tercera División players
CD Getxo players
Athletic Bilbao footballers
Recreativo de Huelva players
CE Sabadell FC footballers
Real Avilés CF footballers
Spain B international footballers
Spain international footballers
Basque Country international footballers